N Innovation 2022 was a professional wrestling event promoted by CyberFight's sub-brand Pro Wrestling Noah. It took place on December 23, 2022, in Tokyo, Japan, at the Shinjuku Face. The event aired on CyberAgent's AbemaTV online linear television service and CyberFight's streaming service Wrestle Universe. It was the last pay-per-view promoted by Noah in 2022.

Background

Storylines
The event featured six professional wrestling matches that resulted from scripted storylines, where wrestlers portrayed villains, heroes, or less distinguishable characters in the scripted events that built tension and culminated in a wrestling match or series of matches.

Event
The event has been opened by the confrontation between one of the promotion's veteran Hi69 and rookie Shoki Kitamura which ended with the latter's victory. Next, Alejandro, Andy Wu and Ninja Mack picked up a victory over Kongo's Hajime Ohara, Shuji Kondo and Tadasuke. The third match saw Yasutaka Yano picking up a victory over Nosawa Rongai. The fourth match portraited the bout between Yoshinari Ogawa and Eita which ended in a no-contest. There have been two title fights in the main card. The first saw Yo-Hey teaming up with Dragon Gate's Kzy and defeating Stinger's sub-group tag team of Atsushi Kotoge and Seiki Yoshioka for the GHC Junior Heavyweight Tag Team Championship.

The main event portraited the confrontation between Dante Leon and Amakusa for the GHC Junior Heavyweight Championship which solded with the latter's victory and with Leon failing to score his first defense. After the match, Amakusa received a challenge from Junta Miyawaki for "The New Year 2023" on January 1.

Results

References

External links
Pro Wrestling Noah official website

Pro Wrestling Noah
CyberAgent
2022 in professional wrestling
December 2022 events in Japan
Professional wrestling in Tokyo
Pro Wrestling Noah shows